Admirable may refer to:

 Admirable class minesweeper, the largest class of minesweepers the US Navy ordered during World War II.
 USS Admirable (AM-136), the lead ship of her class

See also
 Admire, Kansas
 Admire Moon, Japanese racehorse
 Admir, male given name